AHIP may refer to:

 Academy of Health Information Professionals, the peer review and recognition program of the Medical Library Association
 America’s Health Insurance Plans, a health insurance trade association
 Army Helicopter Improvement Program, a program of the U.S. Army to refurbish and upgrade its older helicopters